Maiestas lactipennis is a species of bug from the Cicadellidae family that can be found in Liberia. It was formerly placed within Recilia, but a 2009 revision moved it to Maiestas.

Description
The species are yellow coloured with black head.

References

Insects described in 1962
Endemic fauna of Liberia
Insects of West Africa
Maiestas